Saint James the Less is a 1609 painting by El Greco, now in Toledo Cathedral and produced towards the end of his time in that city. It shows James the Less holding a book and with Saint John the Evangelist and other works forms part of the set of works showing the apostles commissioned by cardinal Bernardo de Sandoval y Rojas.

Bibliography 

 ÁLVAREZ LOPERA, José, El Greco, Madrid, Arlanza, 2005, Biblioteca «Descubrir el Arte», (colección «Grandes maestros»). .
 SCHOLZ-HÄNSEL, Michael, El Greco, Colonia, Taschen, 2003. .
ArteHistoria.com. «Santiago el Menor». [Consulta: 09.01.2011].

Paintings by El Greco
James the Less
1609 paintings